Genetic erosion (also known as genetic depletion) is a process where the limited gene pool of an endangered species diminishes even more when reproductive individuals die off before reproducing with others in their endangered low population. The term is sometimes used in a narrow sense, such as when describing the loss of particular alleles or genes, as well as being used more broadly, as when referring to the loss of a phenotype or whole species.

Genetic erosion occurs because each individual organism has many unique genes which get lost when it dies without getting a chance to breed. Low genetic diversity in a population of wild animals and plants leads to a further diminishing gene pool – inbreeding and a weakening immune system can then "fast-track" that species towards eventual extinction.

By definition, endangered species suffer varying degrees of genetic erosion. Many species benefit from a human-assisted breeding program to keep their population viable, thereby avoiding extinction over long time-frames. Small populations are more susceptible to genetic erosion than larger populations.

Genetic erosion gets compounded and accelerated by habitat loss and habitat fragmentation – many endangered species are threatened by habitat loss and (fragmentation) habitat. Fragmented habitat create barriers in gene flow between populations.

The gene pool of a species or a population is the complete set of unique alleles that would be found by inspecting the genetic material of every living member of that species or population. A large gene pool indicates extensive genetic diversity, which is associated with robust populations that can survive bouts of intense selection. Meanwhile, low genetic diversity (see inbreeding and population bottlenecks) can cause reduced biological fitness and increase the chance of extinction of that species or population.

Processes and consequences
Population bottlenecks create shrinking gene pools, which leave fewer and fewer fertile mating partners. The genetic implications can be illustrated by considering the analogy of a high-stakes poker game with a crooked dealer. Consider that the game begins with a 52-card deck (representing high genetic diversity). Reduction of the number of breeding pairs with unique genes resembles the situation where the dealer deals only the same five cards over and over, producing only a few limited "hands".

As specimens begin to inbreed, both physical and reproductive congenital effects and defects appear more often. Abnormal sperm increases, infertility rises, and birthrates decline. "Most perilous are the effects on the immune defense systems, which become weakened and less and less able to fight off an increasing number of bacterial, viral, fungal, parasitic, and other disease-producing threats. Thus, even if an endangered species in a bottleneck can withstand whatever human development may be eating away at its habitat, it still faces the threat of an epidemic that could be fatal to the entire population."

Loss of agricultural and livestock biodiversity

Genetic erosion in agricultural and livestock is the loss of biological genetic diversity – including the loss of individual genes, and the loss of particular recombinants of genes (or gene complexes) – such as those manifested in locally adapted landraces of domesticated animals or plants that have become adapted to the natural environment in which they originated.

The major driving forces behind genetic erosion in crops are variety replacement, land clearing, overexploitation of species, population pressure, environmental degradation, overgrazing, governmental policy, and changing agricultural systems. The main factor, however, is the replacement of local varieties of domestic plants and animals by other varieties or species that are non-local. A large number of varieties can also often be dramatically reduced when commercial varieties are introduced into traditional farming systems. Many researchers believe that the main problem related to agro-ecosystem management is the general tendency towards genetic and ecological uniformity imposed by the development of modern agriculture.

In the case of Animal Genetic Resources for Food and Agriculture, major causes of genetic erosion are reported to include indiscriminate cross-breeding, increased use of exotic breeds, weak policies and institutions in animal genetic resources management, neglect of certain breeds because of a lack of profitability or competitiveness, the intensification of production systems, the effects of diseases and disease management, loss of pastures or other elements of the production environment, and poor control of inbreeding.

Prevention by human intervention, modern science and safeguards

In situ conservation
With advances in modern bioscience, several techniques and safeguards have emerged to check the relentless advance of genetic erosion and the resulting acceleration of endangered species towards eventual extinction. However, many of these techniques and safeguards are too expensive yet to be practical, and so the best way to protect species is to protect their habitat and to let them live in it as naturally as possible.

Wildlife sanctuaries and national parks have been created to preserve entire ecosystems with all the web of species native to the area. Wildlife corridors are created to join fragmented habitats (see Habitat fragmentation) to enable endangered species to travel, meet, and breed with others of their kind. Scientific conservation and modern wildlife management techniques, with the expertise of scientifically trained staff, help manage these protected ecosystems and the wildlife found in them. Wild animals are also translocated and reintroduced to other locations physically when fragmented wildlife habitats are too far and isolated to be able to link together via a wildlife corridor, or when local extinctions have already occurred.

Ex situ conservation

Modern policies of zoo associations and zoos around the world have begun putting dramatically increased emphasis on keeping and breeding wild-sourced species and subspecies of animals in their registered endangered species breeding programs. These specimens are intended to have a chance to be reintroduced and survive back in the wild. The main objectives of zoos today have changed, and greater resources are being invested in breeding species and subspecies for then ultimate purpose of assisting conservation efforts in the wild. Zoos do this by maintaining extremely detailed scientific breeding records (i.e. studbooks)) and by loaning their wild animals to other zoos around the country (and often globally) for breeding, to safeguard against inbreeding by attempting to maximize genetic diversity however possible.

Costly (and sometimes controversial) ex-situ conservation techniques aim to increase the genetic biodiversity on our planet, as well as the diversity in local gene pools. by guarding against genetic erosion. Modern concepts like seedbanks, sperm banks, and tissue banks have become much more commonplace and valuable. Sperm, eggs, and embryos can now be frozen and kept in banks, which are sometimes called "Modern Noah's Arks" or "Frozen Zoos". Cryopreservation techniques are used to freeze these living materials and keep them alive in perpetuity by storing them submerged in liquid nitrogen tanks at very low temperatures. Thus, preserved materials can then be used for artificial insemination, in vitro fertilization, embryo transfer, and cloning methodologies to protect diversity in the gene pool of critically endangered species.

It can be possible to save an endangered species from extinction by preserving only parts of specimens, such as tissues, sperm, eggs, etc. – even after the death of a critically endangered animal, or collected from one found freshly dead, in captivity or from the wild. A new specimen can then be "resurrected" with the help of cloning, so as to give it another chance to breed its genes into the living population of the respective threatened species. Resurrection of dead critically endangered wildlife specimens with the help of cloning is still being perfected, and is still too expensive to be practical, but with time and further advancements in science and methodology it may well become a routine procedure not to far into the future.

Recently, strategies for finding an integrated approach to in situ and ex situ conservation techniques have been given considerable attention, and progress is being made.

See also
 Center of origin
 Conservation biology
 Crop wild relative
 Gene bank
 Genetic pollution
 Genetics
 Mutational meltdown
 Neglected and underutilized crops
 Population genetics

References

Ecology
Conservation biology
Endangered species
Genetic engineering
Population genetics
Hybridisation (biology)
Breeding
Evolutionary biology